Films produced in Sri Lanka ordered by the date of release

1940s
Sri Lankan films of the 1940s

1950s
List of Sri Lankan films of the 1950s

1960s
List of Sri Lankan films of the 1960s

1970s
List of Sri Lankan films of the 1970s

1980s
List of Sri Lankan films of the 1980s

1990s
List of Sri Lankan films of the 1990s

2000s
List of Sri Lankan films of the 2000s

2010s
List of Sri Lankan films of the 2010s

2020s
List of Sri Lankan films of the 2020s

See also
 Cinema of Sri Lanka
 Films based on Sri Lankan history

External links
Sri Lanka Sinhala Cinema Database - www.films.lk
New Sinhala Films - www.sirisara.lk
New Sinhala Movies
National Film Corporation of Sri Lanka - Official Website
Sri Lankan film at the Internet Movie Database
Sandeshaya Sri Lankan Film Information and Sinhala Film Details
Watch Sinhala teledramas